The Jamaica Rugby League Association is the governing body for the sport of rugby league football in Jamaica. The Association was formed in 2004.

See also

 Rugby league in Jamaica
 Jamaica national rugby league team
 Jamaica women's national rugby league team

References

External links

Rugby league governing bodies
Rugby league in Jamaica
Rugby League
Sports organizations established in 2004